Diospyros styraciformis is a tree in the family Ebenaceae. Inflorescences bear several flowers. The specific epithet  is from the Latin meaning "of Styrax form", referring to resemblance of the fruits to those of the genus Styrax. The fruits are locally used to stun fish. Habitat is forests from sea-level to  altitude. D. styraciformis is found in Sumatra, Peninsular Malaysia and Borneo.

References

styraciformis
Plants described in 1906
Trees of Sumatra
Trees of Peninsular Malaysia
Trees of Borneo